Laura Trachsel (born 16 January 1994) is a Swiss ice hockey player for SC Weinfelden and the Swiss national team. She participated at the 2015 IIHF Women's World Championship.

References

1994 births
Living people
Swiss women's ice hockey forwards
UBC Thunderbirds players